Lauranett Lorraine Lee (born c. 1956) is an American historian, educator, curator, and author. She is a professor at the University of Richmond, and the founding curator for African American History in the Virginia Museum of History and Culture. She specializes in study of the Civil War, Reconstruction, Virginia state history, and African-American history.

Early life and education 
Lauranett L. Lee was born in Chesterfield County, and was raised near Bon Air. Lee's mother work as a computer operator for the U.S. Defense Supply Center.

Lee received a B.A. degree in communications from Mundelein College (now Loyola University Chicago) in Chicago; followed by a M.A. degree from Virginia State University; and a PhD in 2002 from University of Virginia. She studied under Edgar Toppin at VSU, who greatly influenced her work. Her doctoral thesis, Crucible in the Classroom: The Freedpeople and Their Teachers Charlottesville, Virginia, 1861–1876, was on the teachers of the freed people of Charlottesville, Virginia, such as Philena Carkin, a white northern schoolteacher who moved to Charlottesville to teach African Americans after the Civil War.

Career 
Lee had lived in Raleigh, Chicago and Atlanta before returning home to Virginia in 1988, to be closer to family. She had started her career working as a teacher in middle school and high school with the Chesterfield County Public Schools.

From 2000 to 2016, Lee worked at the Virginia Historical Society, now the Virginia Museum of History and Culture. Starting in 2011, she led the development of a database called "Unknown No Longer: A Database of Virginia Slave Names," to help genealogist and families identify people who were once enslaved. Lee wrote a book, "Making the American Dream Work: A Cultural History of African Americans in Hopewell, Virginia" (2008, Morgan James Publishing) on the cultural history of African Americans in Hopewell, Virginia. She has appeared on C-Span.

She was appointed to an advisory council on Virginia's executive mansion. She discussed the history of Juneteenth at Virginia governor Ralph Northam's press conference on making it a state holiday.

Writings

References

External links 
 Profile at University of Richmond

1956 births
21st-century African-American writers
African-American historians
African-American women academics
Historians from Virginia
Living people
Mundelein College alumni
People from Chesterfield County, Virginia
University of Richmond faculty
University of Virginia alumni
Virginia State University alumni